Alexander Karlovich Vekman (July 31, 1884 - April 10, 1955) was a Soviet military leader and vice admiral.

Alexander Vekman was awarded the Order of Lenin, two Orders of the Red Banner, Order of the Patriotic War (1st Class), and numerous medals.

References 

1884 births
1955 deaths
Russian military leaders
Soviet admirals
Soviet military personnel of World War II
Recipients of the Order of Lenin
Recipients of the Order of the Red Banner